K2 is a play by Patrick Meyers. It tells the story of two mountain climbers who find themselves trapped on a ledge on K2, the second-highest mountain in the world. The play premiered at the Arena Stage in Washington, D.C. in April 1982.

Synopsis
K2 is a one-act two-man play.

Production history
K2 first ran at the Arena Stage's Kreeger Theater from April 23 to June 6, 1982. The production was directed by Jacques Levy and starred Stephen McHattie and Stanley Anderson. It received rave reviews from The New York Times and The Washington Post, particularly for Ming Cho Lee's hyper-realistic set design. Lee used over 50,000 board feet of styrofoam to build a set that simulated a massive icy mountainside.

The play opened at the Brooks Atkinson Theatre on Broadway on March 30, 1983. This production was directed by Terry Schreiber and starred Jeffrey DeMunn and Jay Patterson. It closed on June 11, 1983, after 10 previews and 85 regular performances. K2 received three nominations at the 37th Tony Awards, winning Best Scenic Design for Lee's set.

From December 15, 2000, to January 28, 2001, the play was revived at the Arena Stage. Wendy C. Goldberg directed the revival which starred Rick Holmes and Craig Wallace. K2 has also been staged by other regional theaters, such as by the Virginia Stage Company at the Wells Theatre in 2014.

Film adaptation
The play was adapted into a film of the same name in 1992.

References

1982 plays
Broadway plays
American plays adapted into films
Two-handers
Works about mountaineering